Josephine Anne Batson (23 February 1929 – 7 March 2000) was an English cricketer who played as a left-handed batter. She appeared in one Test match for England in 1958, against Australia. She played domestic cricket for Surrey.

References

1929 births
2000 deaths
People from Richmond, London
England women Test cricketers
Surrey women cricketers